Reda Haikal (born ) is an Egyptian male volleyball player. He plays the position of opposite spiker. With his club Zamalek he competed at the 2012 FIVB Volleyball Men's Club World Championship. He has previously played for the Talaea El-Geish and Tomis Constanta teams.

Haikal was born in Cairo.

References

External links
 profile at FIVB.org

1990 births
Living people
Egyptian men's volleyball players
Place of birth missing (living people)
Sportspeople from Cairo